The University of Kara (abbreviated UK) is the second university in Togo after the University of Lomé. Located in the city of Kara, it was established by a presidential (Gnassingbé Eyadema)

decree on 21 January 1999, and opened on 23 January 2004.

History
The university opened on 23 January 2004 with ca. 1600 students.
The Kara American Space was opened in the university's campus on 4 December 2012.
The second largest centre of computing resources of the subregion, after that of the University of Ouagadougou in Burkina Faso, was created in 2013.

References

External links 
 University of Kara

Educational institutions established in 2004
Universities and colleges in Togo
Kara Region
2004 establishments in Togo